cdparanoia is a compact disc ripper for *nix and BeOS, developed by Xiph.org. It is designed to be a minimalistic, high-quality CD ripper that would be able to compensate for and adjust to poor hardware to produce a flawless rip.

libparanoia is a portable and platform-independent library that was made from the important parts ripped from the Linux/gcc-only program cdparanoia. Libparanoia is part of cdrtools.

Design
libparanoia is the foundation of the project and does most of the work, whereas the application cdparanoia is merely an application frontend to libparanoia. The current stable release of the library is Paranoia III.

The guiding principle of cdparanoia's design is "Too many features spoil the broth". cdparanoia is designed to rip correctly and know as much as possible about the CD-ROM hardware instead of implementing extraneous features such as a graphical user interface or a CDDB interface.

Development history
cdparanoia is developed by Xiph.org, the same team behind Vorbis and Theora, who provide public Subversion read-only access.   The project began as a set of patches to cdda2wav, called Paranoia I and II that provided limited error correction and supported few drives.  Paranoia III, (January 1998), was a standalone library for BeOS and Linux.

Status indicators
One of the quirks of cdparanoia is that its ripping status is indicated by an emoticon. As per the cdparanoia manual, the following emoticons are used:

 :-)        Normal operation, low/no jitter
 :-|        Normal operation, considerable jitter
 :-/        Read drift
 :-P        Unreported loss of streaming in atomic read operation
 8-|        Finding read problems at same point during re-read; hard to correct
 :-0        SCSI/ATAPI transport error
 :-(        Scratch detected
 ;-(        Gave up trying to perform a correction
 8-X        Aborted read due to known, uncorrectable error
 :^D        Finished extracting

See also

 Compact disc digital audio
 Cdrtools
 cdrkit
 Exact Audio Copy
 Sound Juicer

Notes

External links
 CDDA Paranoia Homepage
 cdparanoia manual page
 cdparanoia Hydrogenaudio page

Linux CD ripping software
Console CD ripping software
Xiph.Org projects